Sebastián Andrés Balsas Bruno (born 5 March 1986 in Montevideo) is an Uruguayan footballer who plays for Independiente Rivadavia as a centre forward.

Honours
Racing Montevideo
Uruguayan Segunda División: 2007–08

External links
 Argentine League statistics  
 
 

1986 births
Living people
Footballers from Montevideo
Uruguayan footballers
Association football forwards
Racing Club de Montevideo players
Club Nacional de Football players
Argentine Primera División players
San Lorenzo de Almagro footballers
Argentinos Juniors footballers
Segunda División players
Córdoba CF players
Uruguayan expatriate footballers
Expatriate footballers in Argentina
Expatriate footballers in Spain
Uruguayan Primera División players